The 2020–21 Dixie State Trailblazers men's basketball team represented Dixie State University, now Utah Tech University, in the 2020–21 NCAA Division I men's basketball season. The Trailblazers, led by 16th-year head coach Jon Judkins, played their home games at Burns Arena in St. George, Utah as members of the Western Athletic Conference (WAC).

The season marked Dixie State's first year of a four-year transition period from Division II to Division I. As a result, the Trailblazers were not eligible for NCAA postseason play and could not participate in the WAC tournament. They were eligible to play in the CIT or CBI, but were not invited.

Previous season
The Trailblazers finished the 2019–20 season 23–7 overall, 17–5 in RMAC play to win the conference regular season championship. As the 1st seed in the 2020 RMAC Tournament, they were defeated by the No. 4 seeded Colorado Mesa in the semifinals 79–86. They received the No. 3 seed in the South Central Region of the NCAA DII tournament. But, like many sporting events, the tournament was cancelled due to the ongoing COVID-19 pandemic.

Roster

Schedule and results
Dixie State was scheduled to begin their season on November 28 at home against Weber State, but due to COVID-19, this game was canceled. Chicago State announced on December 23rd, 2020 that they would suspend all further men's basketball operations, canceling all conference games in the process.

|-
!colspan=12 style=| Non-conference regular season

|-
!colspan=12 style=| WAC regular season

|-

Source

References

Utah Tech Trailblazers men's basketball seasons
Dixie State
Dixie State Trailblazers men's basketball
Dixie State Trailblazers men's basketball